"Down to Love Town" is a 1976 disco single by The Originals, a Motown group that peaked in popularity in the late 1960s and early 1970s. Although the single reached the #1 spot on disco/dance chart for one week, it hit #93 on the Soul Charts (where The Originals had previously found their success) but had a better showing on the Hot 100, peaking at #47. The song was written by Don Daniels, Michael B. Sutton and Kathy Wakefield. It was originally a track on their 1976 album, Communique. Following its success as a single, the track became the title track of their 1977 album of the same name., which was their final album for Motown.

References

1976 singles
The Originals (band) songs
Motown singles
Disco songs
Songs written by Kathy Wakefield
Song recordings produced by Frank Wilson (musician)
1976 songs